"Time is Money, Efficiency is Life" is a well-known slogan of Chinese economic reform. It was initially a quote from Yuan Geng who made it public in 1981 as the director of Shekou, Shenzhen. The slogan is often associated with the "Shenzhen speed". After Deng Xiaoping made an inspection tour to Shenzhen in 1984, the slogan became widely known in China.

See also 
 Time is money (aphorism)
 Shenzhen speed
 Shekou

References

Economy of Shenzhen
Political catchphrases